Nawaf Al Shuwaye ((born 3 August 1983) is a Kuwaiti footballer who is a defensive midfielder for the Kuwaiti Premier League club Al Arabi.

References

External links

1976 births
Living people
Kuwaiti footballers
Sportspeople from Kuwait City
Association football midfielders
Kuwait international footballers
Al-Arabi SC (Kuwait) players
Kuwait Premier League players